Macrocheilus madagascariensis is a species of ground beetle in the subfamily Anthiinae. It was described by Basilewsky in 1953.

References

Anthiinae (beetle)
Beetles described in 1953